Electronic Sports League One Cologne 2014, also known as ESL One Cologne 2014, was the third Counter-Strike: Global Offensive Major Championship. The tournament was held during Gamescom 2014 from August 14–17, 2014 at the Cologne Exhibition Centre in Cologne, Germany. It was the second CS:GO Major of 2014. It was organized by Electronic Sports League with sponsorship from Valve. The tournament had a total prize pool of US$250,000.

Ninjas in Pyjamas won the event by beating Fnatic 2–1 in the finals. The tournament was livestreamed on the official ESL Twitch channel. Over 400,000 concurrent viewers watched the grand finals, while 2,950,600 total unique viewers watched the event across four days.

Format
The top seven teams from EMS One Katowice 2014 qualified as Legends. LGB eSports would have had a Legends spot as the eighth finalist from Katowice 2014, but disbanded before Cologne 2015. Six teams from Europe, one team from North America, one team from the Oceanic region, and one team from India played online qualifiers in order to play in the tournament

Teams were split into four seeded groups, and all group matches were best-of-one. In the first round of matches, the highest and lowest seeds faced each other, and the second and third seeds played each other. The winner of those two matches then played to determine the first team to move on to the playoff stage, while the losers played to eliminate one team from the tournament. With one team advanced and one eliminated, the final two teams faced off to decide the remaining playoff spot. This format is known as the GSL format, named for the Global StarCraft II League.

The playoff bracket consisted of eight teams, two from each group. All of these matches were single elimination, best-of-three. Teams advanced in the bracket until a winner was decided.

Map Pool
There were seven maps to choose from, two more than the previous Major. Train was removed for the tournament, while Cache, Overpass, and Cobblestone were added. Overpass was released by Valve only a month before the tournament, and the decision to add a new map on such short notice before a Major caused some controversy.

Before each match in the group stage, both teams banned two maps. The map for the match was then randomly selected from the remaining three maps. In the playoffs, each team first banned one map, then chose one map. The two chosen maps were the first two maps in the best-of-three. If the series were to require a third map, the map was randomly selected from the three remaining maps.

Qualifiers

European Qualifier
There were 16 teams in the main European qualifier. Four teams from each regional qualifier – Open, North, Southeast, and Southwest – were in the tournament. The tournament was a best of three, double-elimination bracket, with six teams qualifying to the Major.

North American Qualifier
This was a 16 team, single elimination bracket with just one team qualifying for the Major.

Oceanic Qualifier
This was an 8 team, single elimination bracket with just one team qualifying for the Major.

Indian Qualifier
LGB eSports, which placed third at the previous Major, disbanded, so only seven Legends remained. The tournament organizers decided to fill up the remaining spot with a team from India. This qualifier had 8 teams. The teams played in a robin round and the top four teams played in a double elimination bracket.

Broadcast Talent
Hosts
 Paul "ReDeYe" Chaloner
 Scott "SirScoots" Smith

Analyst
 Richard Lewis

Commentators
 Anders Blume
 Auguste "Semmler" Massonnat
 Joshua "steel" Nissan
 Stuart "TosspoT" Saw
 Lauren "Pansy" Scott

Teams

Group stage

Group A

Group B

Group C

Group D

Playoffs

Bracket

Quarterfinals

Semifinals

Finals

Final standings

References

External links
 Official webpage

2014 in German sport
2014 in esports
Sports competitions in Cologne
Counter-Strike: Global Offensive Majors
ESL One Counter-Strike competitions